Elmer Ferdinand Piper (October 9, 1906 — February 12, 1974) was a Canadian ice hockey player and coach.

Piper was a member of the Saskatoon Quakers who represented Canada at the 1934 World Championships held in Milan, Italy where they won Gold.

See also
 List of Canadian national ice hockey team rosters

References

External links
 

1906 births
1974 deaths
Canada men's national ice hockey team coaches
Canadian ice hockey coaches
Canadian ice hockey players
Eastern Hockey League coaches
Saskatoon Quakers players